Nanganjiyar  is a river flowing in the Karur district of the Indian state of Tamil Nadu.
It is tributary of Amaravati River.

References

See also 
List of rivers of Tamil Nadu

Rivers of Tamil Nadu
Karur district
Rivers of India